The 2022 United States Senate election in Iowa was held on November 8, 2022 to elect a member of the United States Senate to represent the State of Iowa. Incumbent Republican Senator Chuck Grassley faced Democratic nominee Michael Franken.

Grassley was first elected in 1980 and was most recently re-elected in 2016. Grassley, who turned 89 years old on September 17, 2022, ran for reelection to an eighth term. With U.S. Senator Patrick Leahy retiring the same year, he became the second-oldest person ever to be re-elected for another term (behind Strom Thurmond in 1996 at age 93), the most senior member in the Senate, the longest-serving Republican Senator in history (overtaking Orrin Hatch), as well as the most senior member of Congress. Grassley was reelected, thereby becoming the first Republican to win an eighth Senate term.

This was Grassley's closest Senate race since he was first elected in 1980 and the first election since that time in which he did not crack 60% of the vote. In the process Franken beat Grassley in several counties that he had won consistently since 1986- those being Black Hawk County, Linn County, 
Story County, and Polk County.

Republican primary

Candidates

Nominee
Chuck Grassley, incumbent U.S. Senator (1981–present) and president pro tempore emeritus (2021–present)

Eliminated in primary
Jim Carlin, state senator from the 3rd district (2017–present)

Declined
Matthew Whitaker, former acting U.S. Attorney General, former U.S. Attorney for the Southern District of Iowa, and candidate for the U.S. Senate in 2014 (endorsed Grassley)

Fundraising

Results

Democratic primary

Candidates

Nominee
Michael Franken, retired U.S. Navy Admiral, former aide to U.S. Senator Ted Kennedy, and candidate for U.S. Senate in 2020

Eliminated in primary
Glenn Hurst, Minden city councilor and chair of the Iowa Democratic Party Rural Caucus

Withdrew
Dave Muhlbauer, former Crawford County supervisor (2017–2021) (endorsed Franken)
Bob Krause, former state representative (endorsed Franken)

Declined
Rob Sand, Iowa State Auditor (2019–present) (ran for reelection)

Campaign
Former U.S. Representative Abby Finkenauer was the original frontrunner in the Democratic primary, with her campaign being backed by several prominent politicians and labor unions, as well as the influential political action committee EMILY's List. However, retired vice-admiral Michael Franken managed to slowly overtake her as the perceived frontrunner, assisted by an effective campaign that highlighted his leadership credentials.

Fundraising

Endorsements

Polling
Graphical summary

Results

General election

Predictions

Debates

Endorsements

Polling
Aggregate polls

Graphical summary

Chuck Grassley vs. Abby Finkenauer

Results

By congressional district
Grassley won all 4 congressional districts.

See also 
 2022 United States Senate elections
 2022 Iowa elections

Notes  

Partisan clients

References

External links
Official campaign websites
 Michael Franken (D) for Senate
 Chuck Grassley (R) for Senate

2022
Iowa
United States Senate